Raju Kannada Medium is an Indian Kannada language romantic comedy film written and directed by Naresh Kumar. It features Gurunandan and Avantika Shetty in the lead roles. Achyuth Kumar, Suchendra Prasad, Sadhu Kokila and the Russian model Angelina Desedina play the supporting roles. The score and soundtrack for the film is by Kiran Ravindranath and the cinematography is by Shekhar Chandra.

The film was earlier titled as Raju Rangitaranga owing to the combination of the lead pair who found success with their earlier films 1st Rank Raju and RangiTaranga respectively. The project marks the second collaboration of director Naresh Kumar, actor Gurunandan, and music director Kiran Ravindranath after their previous successful film 1st Rank Raju. The principal photography started in July 2016 in Bangalore. The filming is also held at Ooty. The film was released on 19 January 2018

Cast

 Gurunandan as Raju
 Avantika Shetty as Nisha
 Sudeepa as Deepak Chakravarthy, extended cameo appearance
 Ashika Ranganath as vidya
 Achyuth Kumar
 Suchendra Prasad
 Sadhu Kokila
Vinayak Joshi
 Angelina Desedina
 Kuri Prathap
 Pratham in a guest appearance
 Kirik Keerthi in a guest appearance 
 Chandan Shetty in a guest appearance
 Om Prakash Rao in a guest appearance

Soundtrack

The film's background score and the soundtracks are composed by Kiran Ravindranath. The music rights were acquired by Ananda Audio.

Release
The film released  on 19 January 2018.

Critical reception
Movie has got mixed review from the movie Critics. Sunayana Suresh of The Times of India  scored the film at 2.5 out of 5 stars and wrote The film has some good cinematography. The songs too are catchy. One wishes the film could have utilized the same better. Sudeep's cameo is quite crucial plot, but the filmmaker has chosen to add a lot of extra twists. Manoj Kumar R of The Indian Express gave the film a rating of 2.5/5 and wrote The film could have been much better if only Naresh had the will to swim against the tide. S Sivaraman of The Hindu stated Raju Kannada Medium is a huge flop. The director simply doesn’t know how to take the rudderless plot forward.

References

External links
 
 
 Raju Kannada Medium movie info

2018 films
2010s Kannada-language films
Indian romantic comedy films
Films set in Bangalore
2018 romantic comedy films